Tang is a village and a half-parish in County Westmeath, on the N55 national secondary road between Athlone and Ballymahon, County Longford. Tang is in the parish of Drumraney. It is in County Westmeath but on the border with County Longford from which it is separated by the 'Dungorman River which flows into Lough Ree 3 km downstream via the River Inny.

See also
 List of towns and villages in the Republic of Ireland
 Matt Devlin

References

External links 
 Tang Muintir Community Council

Towns and villages in County Westmeath